University-Oxford Airport  is a public use airport located two nautical miles (4 km) northwest of the central business district of Oxford, a city in Lafayette County, Mississippi, United States. The airport is owned by the University of Mississippi. It is included in the National Plan of Integrated Airport Systems for 2011–2015, which categorized it as a general aviation facility.

Facilities and aircraft 
University-Oxford Airport covers an area of 297 acres (120 ha) at an elevation of 452 feet (138 m) above mean sea level. It has one runway designated 9/27 with an asphalt surface measuring 5,600 by 100 feet (1,707 x 30 m).

For the 12-month period ending December 31, 2011, the airport had 65,811 aircraft operations, an average of 180 per day: 89% general aviation, 9% air taxi, 2% military, and <1% scheduled commercial. At that time there were 39 aircraft based at this airport: 64% single-engine, 28% multi-engine, and 8% jet.

Historical Air Service 
In 1975, Southern Airways became to the first airline to serve Oxford with direct flights to Greenwood and Memphis using Martin 404 piston airliners. There were two flights per day to both destinations. Republic Airlines took over both routes using Swearingen Metroliners after they merged with Southern Airways in 1979. Due to an increase in demand, Republic upgraded the service to Convair 580 turboprop airliners in 1981. Republic Airlines left Oxford in 1985. In 1985, Flight Line added direct flights to Greenwood, Jackson, Memphis, and Tupelo using Piper Navajo and Cessna 402 piston aircraft. 

More recently, in 2013, Southern Airways Express began flying from Oxford to Destin, Panama City, Jackson, and Gulfport using Cessna 208B turboprop aircraft. The service lasted until 2016 when it was quietly phased out. The airport currently has no airline service.

Charter Operations 
The airport serves most charter flights for the University of Mississippi. Basketball, Baseball, Volleyball, and Soccer bring many different aircraft. These include Embraer E145 regional jets from United Express, Dornier 328JET aircraft from Ultimate Jet Charter, and the Boeing 737-200 for Ameristar. These aircraft bring excitement for airport employees and aircraft spotters alike.

Recent Developments 
In 2017, a new apron was built at the airport in order to accommodate more aircraft during football season. In addition, a new fuel depot has been constructed, and the airport has received luggage belt loaders and ground power units. Nicholas Air has recently moved their corporate office to Oxford, MS and will soon base their entire fleet of aircraft at the University-Oxford Airport.

References

External links 

 Airport page at University of Mississippi
 Aerial image as of February 1991 from USGS The National Map
 

Airports in Mississippi
Buildings and structures in Lafayette County, Mississippi
Transportation in Lafayette County, Mississippi
University and college airports
University of Mississippi